Brownsville Covered Bridge was a historic long truss covered bridge located at Brownsville, Union County, Indiana. It was built between 1837 and 1840, and was a single span covered timber bridge. The bridge spanned the East Fork of the Whitewater River.

It was listed on the National Register of Historic Places in 1973 and delisted in 1974. The bridge was photographed by the Historic American Engineering Record in April 1974 as it was being dismantled for relocation to Eagle Creek Park in Indianapolis. It was instead used to replace the Clifty Bridge in Mill Race Park in Columbus in 1985.

See also
List of bridges documented by the Historic American Engineering Record in Indiana

References

External links

Bridges completed in 1840
Buildings and structures in Union County, Indiana
Covered bridges in Indiana
Former National Register of Historic Places in Indiana
Historic American Engineering Record in Indiana
Long truss bridges in the United States
Wooden bridges in Indiana